The Redmarbled lizardfish (Synodus rubromarmoratus), is a species of lizardfish that primarily lives in the Indo-West Pacific.

References 

Synodontidae
Taxa named by Barry C. Russell
Taxa named by Roger Frank Cressey Jr. 
Fish described in 1979